Robert Greenhill may refer to:

 Robert Greenhill-Russell (1763–1836), British politician
 Robert F. Greenhill (born 1936), American businessman
 Robert G. Greenhill (born 1962), Canadian businessman, civil servant and expert on international development